The following is a list of major educational institutions located in the city of Barisal in Bangladesh.

Universities 
 University of Barisal (Public)
 Global University Bangladesh (Private)
 University of Global Village (Private)
 Trust University, Barishal (Private)

Colleges 

 Brojomohun College
 Govt. Fazlul Huq College, Chakhar
 Government Syed Hatem Ali College
 Amrita Lal Dey College
 Barisal Government Women's College
 Government Barisal College
 Begum Tofazzal Hossain Manik Mia Mohila College
 Barisal Islamia College
 Barisal Law College
 Rupatoli Jagua College

Medical colleges 
 Sher-e-Bangla Medical College
 Sher-e-Bangla Medical College Dental Unit
 Apex Homeopathic Medical College
 Barisal Nursing College
 Institute of Health Technology, Barisal
 Bangladesh Institute of Health and technology, Barisal

Engineering colleges 
 Shaheed Abdur Rab Serniabat Textile Engineering College
 Barisal Engineering College
 Shaheed Abdur Rab Serniabat Textile Institute, Gournadi

Polytechnic institutes 
 Barisal Polytechnic Institute 
 Infra Polytechnic Institute
 Barishal Information Technology College
 Ideal Polytechnic Institute
 United Polytechnic Institute

Higher secondary schools 
 Brojomohun College
 Barisal Government Women's College
 Government Syed Hatem Ali College
 Barisal Cadet College
 Government Barisal College
 Amrita Lal Dey College
 Barishal Government Model School And College
 Alekanda Government College
 Shahid Abdur Rab Serniabat College, Kawnia
 Jagadish Saraswat Girls School & College
 A Karim Ideal College, Palashpur
 Barisal Metropolitan College
 Barisal City College (Day & Night)
 Royal Central College
 Rupatoli Jagua College
 Kashipur High School and College
 Kashipur Girls High School and College
 Mahanagar Day & Night College
 Jahanara Israil School & College (English version)

High schools  

 Barishal International School,Rupatali,Barishal.
 Barisal Government Girls High School
 Barishal Government Model School and College
 Barisal Zilla School
 Shahid Abdur Rab Serniabat Government High School
 Shahid Arjumoni Government High School
 Oxford Mission High School
 Baptist Mission Boys' High School
 Bapist Mission Girls' High School
 Halima Khatun Girls' Secondary School
 Brojomohun School
 Asmat Ali Khan (A.K.) Institution
 Sabera Khatun Girls' Secondary School
 Collegiate Secondary School
 Mathuranath Public School
 Kaunia Girls' High School
 Alekanda Girls' High School 
 Jagadish Saraswat Girls School & College
 Fazlul Huq Residential School and College
 Royal Central School and College
 A.R.S. Secondary Girls' School
 Kashipur High School and College
 Kashipur Girls' High School and College
 Shahid Altaf Smrity Secondary Girls School 
 A Wahed Secondary Girls School 
 Sher-e-Bangla Girls Secondary School
Nuria Secondary High School
 Mamtaz Majidunnesa Girls Secondary School
 Town High School
 Barisal Residential School and College, Rupatoli
 S.C.G.M. Secondary School (Chaitanya School)
 Udayan Secondary School

English medium schools 
 Adventist International Mission School
 Jahanara Israil School & College (English Version)

Religious schools 
 Charmonai Madrasah
 Jamia Islamia Mahmudia
 Jamia Islamia Hosainia Madrasah
 Lutfur Rahman Cadet Madrasah
 Sagardi Kamil Madrasah

Technical schools 
 Technical Training Center (T.T.C.), Barisal
 Barisal Mohila Technical Training Center
 Barisal Govt. Technical School & College
 UCEP Training School
 Trust College of Skill Development
 Youth Development Academy
 Govt. Physical Education College, Barisal
 Bilkis Jahan Technical School & BM College

Drama schools 
 Kheyali Group Theater
 Shabdaboli Group Theater
 Barisal Natok
 Barisal Theatre
 Ponchosiri Group Theatre
 Natyam Barisal
 Kirtonkhola Group Theatre
 Brojomohon Theatre
 Barisal Shilpomoncho

Art schools
 Barisal Charukola School
 Barisal Shishu Academy
 Barisal Shilpakola Academy
 Mir Mujtaba Ali Art School (Kheyali Group Theatre).
 Shahid Altaf Mahmud Music School
 Khelaghar Barisal
 Udichi Barisal
 Chader Hat
 Akshar Shahittya
 Tansen Music School
 Prantik Music & Dance School

Training institutes 
 Shaheed Abdur Rob Serniabat Teacher Training College
 Higher Secondary Teacher Training Institute
 Sagardi Primary Teacher Training Institute
 Agriculture Training Institute, Rahmatpur

Research institutions 
 Bangladesh Rice Research Institution, Barisal
 Bangladesh Agricultural Research Institution, Barisal

Special schools 
 Barisal Night High School
 Barisal Intellectually disabled School

See also 
 List of educational institutions in Sylhet
 List of educational institutions in Khulna
 List of Educational Institutions in Comilla

References 

Educational institutions in Barisal
Education in Barisal
Barisal